Trinidad and Tobago competed at the 1956 Summer Olympics in Melbourne, Australia. Six competitors, all men, took part in seven events in three sports.

Athletics

Cycling

Sprint
 Hylton Mitchell — 13th place

Time trial
 Hylton Mitchell — 1:16.5 (→ 19th place)

Individual road race
 Hylton Mitchell — did not finish (→ no ranking)

Weightlifting

References

External links
 Official Olympic Reports
 International Olympic Committee results database

Nations at the 1956 Summer Olympics
1956
1956 in Trinidad and Tobago